Eva Pate (born May 11, 2000) is an American ice dancer. With her skating partner and fiancé, Logan Bye, she is a two-time ISU Challenger Series silver medalist.

Personal life 
Pate was born on May 11, 2000, in Cleveland, Ohio, to parents Jenny and David Pate. She has a younger brother, Gavin, who plays hockey at Eastern Michigan University. Pate is a graduate of Strongsville High School and currently attends Cuyahoga Community College.

Pate began dating Logan Bye in December 2018, before becoming on-ice partners. They became engaged in August 2022.

Career

Early years 
Pate began learning to skate at age five after attending an ice rink event with her Girl Scout troop. By age 10, she was on the verge of quitting skating, with practice becoming a "daily grind." At the suggestion of coach Janet Wene, she switched to the recently formed solo ice dance competition circuit, which had been started the year earlier to create more opportunities for girls in the sport who lacked partners. Pate reached the national championship in solo dance for the first time in 2012, finishing sixth. The following year, she placed fourth, winning the pewter medal. Watching the 2014 Winter Olympics in Sochi inspired Pate to definitively choose to focus on ice dance over gymnastics, which she had also been participating in until that point. For the 2014 solo dance championship, she won the pattern dance competition and qualified to the juvenile free dance competition for the first time, finishing fourth.

In November 2015, Pate was referred to Marina Zoueva, the coach of Olympic dance champions Virtue/Moir and Davis/White. For the next three years, she split time between Cleveland and Zoueva's base in Canton, Michigan before moving to train full-time in 2018. In January 2019 she left Zoueva to train with Igor Shpilband in Novi, Michigan.

2019–20 season 
Pate had begun dating ice dancer Logan Bye in December 2018, and in June 2019, they decided to become an on-ice partnership, her first in competitive ice dance. They were coached by Shpilband, Pasquale Camerlengo, Adrienne Lenda and Natalia Deller in Novi.

Pate/Bye made their domestic debut at the Midwestern Sectional Dance Challenge, taking the silver medal. They went on to win the U.S. Ice Dance Final in Hyannis, Massachusetts. This, in turn, qualified them for their debut at the 2020 U.S. Championships, held in Greensboro, where they placed seventh.

2020–21 season 
Due to the onset of the COVID-19 pandemic, competition opportunities were limited both domestically and internationally for the 2020–21 season. Pate/Bye were assigned to make their Grand Prix debut at the 2020 Skate America in Las Vegas, attended primarily by American skaters due to travel restrictions pandemic. They finished in seventh place.

At the U.S. national championships later that season, also in Las Vegas, they were seventh as well.

2021–22 season 
With the resumption of a more normal international calendar, Pate/Bye made their season debut at the Lake Placid Ice Dance International, where they placed fifth. They were assigned the U.S. Classic where they earned their first international bronze medal. Pate said of the occasion that "we have been training really hard every day and just being able to be out here and put out a clean skate makes me feel really proud of us." Making their debut on the Challenger series, they were seventh at the 2021 ISU Warsaw Cup. The assignment to Warsaw was Pate's first-ever trip outside the United States.

At the U.S. Championships, Pate/Bye finished in eighth.

2022–23 season 
The new Olympic cycle brought began with the international dance scene considerably altered from the norm, with Russian teams banned as a result of the Russo-Ukrainian War. For their program music, their rhythm dance included soundtrack music from the 2011 film Rio, which Pate had previously used in her solo dance career. Their free dance, to Riverdance, was an acknowledgement of the couple's Irish American heritage.

Pate/Bye started their season at the Lake Placid Ice Dance International, where they took the silver medal. They were given two Challenger circuit assignments after that, first winning the silver medal at the 2022 CS U.S. Classic, held in Lake Placid. They set new personal bests in the process, with Bye adding that "we wanted to put out what we've been training, so I thought it went well." They went on to win a second silver medal at the 2022 CS Nepela Memorial. The team received their second ever Grand Prix assignment for the 2022 Grand Prix de France. Pate described her reaction to the news "my mom called me, and she was like, ‘You're going to France!’ and I'm like, ‘that’s crazy!’ I was so excited." They finished fifth at the event. Pate/Bye were selected to compete in a third Challenger circuit assignment, 2022 CS Golden Spin of Zagreb, where they earned a seasons best free dance score and finished fourth.

Concluding the season at the 2023 U.S. Championships, Pate/Bye finished eighth for the second consecutive year.

Programs

With Bye

Competitive highlights 
GP: Grand Prix; CS: Challenger Series

With Bye

References

External links 
 
 

2000 births
Living people
American female ice dancers
People from Cleveland